Eric Tingstad and Nancy Rumbel are musicians who have performed, recorded and traveled together since 1985, and are responsible for 19 albums.

Eric Tingstad is a composer who plays fingerstyle guitar. Nancy Rumbel plays oboe, English horn and the double ocarina. Eric and Nancy began their collaboration in 1985. Their debut album was The Gift. Their album American Acoustic was honored as "Acoustic Instrumental Album of the Year" in 1998. In 2000, they appeared at Carnegie Hall. Their album Acoustic Garden received the Award for Best New Age Album at the 45th Grammy Awards in February 2003.

Biographies
Nancy grew up in San Antonio and continued her musical education at Northwestern University, where she was introduced to new influences and styles. Intrigued by ethnomusicology, she joined the Paul Winter Consort. Eric grew up in Seattle and attended Western Washington University where he was trained in the Segovian classic guitar tradition. He is a product of influences such as Led Zeppelin, Hawaiian slack-key guitar, Ravi Shankar, and Martin Denny.

Discography
 1985 - The Gift: Acoustic Offerings for the Holiday Season
 1986 - Emerald (with Spencer Brewer)
 1987 - Woodlands  (with David Lanz)
 1988 - Legends
 1990 - Homeland
 1991 - In the Garden 
 1993 - Give and Take
 1994 - Star of Wonder 
 1995 - A Sense of Place (Tingstad solo)
 1995 - Notes from the Tree of Life (Rumbel solo) 
 1997 - Pastorale: Music of Nature and Grace
 1998 - American Acoustic (2-CD set)
 2000 - Paradise
 2001 - A Dream and a Wish: An Offering of Children's Classics
 2002 - Acoustic Garden (Grammy winner)
 2004 - Comfort and Joy 
 2005 - A Moment's Peace 
 2009 - Leap of Faith

Compilation appearances
New Age Music & New Sounds Vol.67 - "Liberty"
Narada Film and Television Music Sampler
Narada Collection Series : A Childhood Remembered : A Musical Tribute To The Wonder Of Childhood

References

External links

New-age music groups
Chamber jazz ensembles
Grammy Award winners
Narada Productions artists